The Luxembourg national under-21 football team is the national representative under-21 football team of Luxembourg.  It is controlled by the Luxembourg Football Federation (FLF). The team is the feeder team to the Luxembourg's national team. The team competes in the biennial European Under-21 Championship. Since the establishment of the UEFA European Under-21 Football Championship in 1978 the team has always finished bottom of their qualification group.

The team is for Luxembourgian players aged under 21 at the start of the calendar year in which a two-year European Under-21 Football Championship campaign begins, so some players can remain with the squad until the age of 23. As long as they are eligible, players can play for Luxembourg at any level, making it possible to play for the U21s, senior side, and again for the U21s. This has been the case for several senior team players like Billy Bernard, Lars Gerson and Maurice Deville. In their history they have only ever won two qualification games. Their first win occurred in their 1986 UEFA European Under-21 Football Championship qualification campaign where they defeated Belgium 3–1. Their second victory came in a 2011 UEFA European Under-21 Football Championship qualification Group 3 away game against Bosnia and Herzegovina in a 1–0 win.

Competition records

UEFA European Under-21 Football Championship

 A.  Wins were worth 2 points each until the 1990 tournament.
Last updated: 17 July 2012
Pos. = Position; Pl = Match played; W = Win; D = Draw; L = Lost; GS = Goal scored; GA = Goal against; P = Points

2021 UEFA European Under-21 Football Championship

Recent results and forthcoming fixtures

Current squad
 The following players were called up for the 2023 UEFA European Under-21 Championship qualification matches.
 Match dates: 2, 6 and 10 June 2022
 Opposition: ,  and 
 Caps and goals correct as of: 2 June 2022, after the match against .
 Names in italics denote players who have been capped for the senior team.

See also
 Luxembourg national football team
 Luxembourg women's national football team

References

External links
 Official site 
 Team profile & squad at UEFA.com

European national under-21 association football teams
under-21